Lichen ruber is one of several diseases of the skin:

 Lichen ruber moniliformis (Wise–Rein disease)
 Lichen ruber planus (lichen planus)